Jason Edward Hickel (born 1982) is an economic anthropologist whose research focuses on ecological economics, global inequality, imperialism and political economy. He is known for his books The Divide: A Brief Guide to Global Inequality and its Solutions (2017) and Less Is More: How Degrowth Will Save the World (2020). He is a professor at the Institute for Environmental Science and Technology at the Autonomous University of Barcelona, a Visiting Senior Fellow at the International Inequalities Institute at the London School of Economics, and a Fellow of the Royal Society of Arts.

Background
Hickel was born and raised in Swaziland (now Eswatini) where his parents were doctors at the height of the AIDS crisis. He holds a bachelor's degree in anthropology from Wheaton College, USA (2004). He worked in the non-profit sector in Nagaland, India and in Swaziland, and received his PhD in anthropology from the University of Virginia in August 2011. His doctoral thesis was entitled Democracy and Sabotage: Moral Order and Political Conflict in KwaZulu-Natal, South Africa. He taught at the London School of Economics from 2011 to 2017, where he held a Leverhulme Early Career Fellowship, and at Goldsmiths, University of London, from 2017 to 2021.

He served on the U.K. Labour Party task force on international development in 2017–2019. As of 2020 he serves on the Harvard-Lancet Commission on Reparations and Redistributive Justice, on the Statistical Advisory Panel for the UN Human Development Report, and on the advisory board for the Green New Deal for Europe.

Scholarship

International development 
Writing for a piece published in the journal World Development and in an accompanying opinion piece for Al Jazeera, Hickel, along with co-author Dylan Sullivan, dispute the notion that, prior to the 19th century, the vast majority of humanity lived in extreme poverty which was eventually ameliorated by the rise of capitalism. On the contrary, they argue that it was the emergence of colonialism and the shoehorning of regions into the capitalist world system starting in the "long 16th century" that created "periods of severe social and economic dislocation" which resulted in wages crashing to subsistence levels and surging premature mortality. In India, for example, Hickel and Sullivan write that "under the aegis of British capitalism," tens of millions lost their lives, with excess deaths rising to around 100 million for the years 1880 to 1920, which is greater than all the famines that occurred under communist governments combined. They conclude that human welfare only really began to increase in the 20th century, and note that this development coincided with "the rise of anti-colonial and socialist political movements."

In The Divide, Hickel argued that the dominant narrative of "progress" in international development is overstated, and that poverty remains a widespread and persistent feature of the global economy, reproduced by power imbalances between the Global North and Global South. Hickel argues that the poverty line used to underwrite the progress narrative, US$1.90 per day (2011 PPP), has no empirical grounding in actual human needs, and is inadequate to achieve basic nutrition and health. Hickel draws on empirical studies to show that closer to US$7.40 per day is required for nutrition and health, and that the number of people living under this threshold has increased from 3.2 billion in 1981 to 4.2 billion in 2015, according to World Bank data. The vast majority of gains against poverty have been achieved by China and East Asian countries that were not subjected to structural adjustment schemes. Elsewhere, increases in income among the poor have been very small, and mostly inadequate to lift people out of poverty.

In a 2022 article published in Global Environmental Change, Hickel and a team of scholars state that in the globalized neoliberal capitalist economy, the Global North still relies on "imperialist appropriation" of resources and labor from the Global South, which annually amounts to "12 billion tons of embodied raw material equivalents, 822 million hectares of embodied land, 21 exajoules of embodied energy, and 188 million person-years of embodied labour, worth $10.8 trillion in Northern prices – enough to end extreme poverty 70 times over." From 1990 to 2015, this net appropriation amounted to $242 trillion. Hickel et al. write that this unequal exchange is a leading driver of uneven development, increasing global inequality and environmental degradation.

On his blog, Hickel has criticised claims by Hans Rosling and others that global inequality has been decreasing and the gap between poor countries and rich countries has disappeared. This narrative relies on relative metrics (such as the "elephant graph"), which Hickel says obscure the fact that absolute inequality has worsened considerably over the past decades: the real per capita income gap between the Global North and Global South has quadrupled since 1960, and the incomes of the richest one percent have increased by one hundred times more than the incomes of the poorest 60% of humanity over the period 1980 to 2016. Hickel has argued that absolute metrics are the appropriate measure for assessing inequality trends in the world economy.

According to Hickel, the focus on aid as a tool for international development depoliticises poverty and misleads people into believing that rich countries are benevolent toward poorer countries. In reality, he says, financial flows from rich countries to poor countries are outstripped by flows that go in the opposite direction, including external debt service, tax evasion by multinational companies, patent licensing fees and other outflows resulting from structural features of neoliberal globalisation. Moreover, Hickel argues that poor countries suffer significant losses due to international trade and finance rules (such as under structural adjustment programmes, free trade agreements, and the WTO framework) which depress their potential export revenues and prevent them from using protective tariffs, subsidies, and capital controls as tools for national economic development. According to Hickel, global poverty is ultimately an artefact of these structural imbalances. Focusing on aid distracts from the substantive reforms that would be necessary to address these problems.

Climate change and ecological economics
In 2020, Hickel published research in The Lancet Planetary Health  asserting that a small number of high-income countries are responsible for the overwhelming majority of historical CO2 emissions in excess of the planetary boundary (350 ppm). His analysis asserts that the US is responsible for 40%, the EU is responsible for 29%, and the Global North as a group is responsible for 92%. He has also argued that high-income nations are disproportionately responsible for other forms of global ecological breakdown, given their high levels of resource use.

In a review paper written with the ecological economist Giorgos Kallis, Hickel argues that narratives about "green growth" have little empirical validity. They point to evidence showing that it is not feasible for high-income nations to achieve absolute reductions in resource use, or to reduce emissions to zero fast enough stay within the carbon budget for 2 °C if they continue to pursue GDP growth at historical rates. Hickel and his colleagues argue that high-income nations need to scale down excess energy and resource use (i.e., "degrowth") in order to achieve a rapid transition to 100% renewable energy and reverse ecological breakdown. He has argued that high-income nations do not need economic growth in order to achieve social goals; they can reduce excess resource and energy use while at the same time improving human well-being, by distributing income more fairly, expanding universal public goods, shortening the working week, and introducing a public job guarantee.

In 2020, Hickel proposed a Sustainable Development Index, which adjusts the Human Development Index by accounting for nations' ecological impact, in terms of per capita emissions and resource use.

Journalism
Hickel writes on global development and political economy, and has contributed to The Guardian, Foreign Policy and Al Jazeera, as well as Jacobin and other media outlets.

Awards
 Association of Social Anthropologists of the UK and the Commonwealth (ASA) Annual Award for Teaching and Lecturing in Anthropology, 2013.

Books

 (2018). The Divide: Global Inequality from Conquest to Free Markets. WWNorton.

References

Further reading

Hickel, Jason (March 2019) “Degrowth: a theory of radical abundance”, Real-World Economics Review, issue no. 87, 19, pp. 54–68.

External links

 
 Jason Hickel articles for Al Jazeera
 Jason Hickel articles for Current Affairs
 Jason Hickel articles for Foreign Policy
 Jason Hickel articles for The Guardian.
 Jason Hickel articles for Jacobin.

1982 births
Living people
Swazi
Wheaton College (Illinois) alumni
University of Virginia alumni
American anthropologists
Labour Party (UK) people
Ecological economists
People associated with criticism of economic growth
Economic anthropologists